James Martin Barnes (January 9, 1899June 8, 1958) was a member of the U.S. House of Representatives from Illinois and administrative assistant to Presidents Franklin D. Roosevelt and Harry S. Truman.

Early life
James Martin Barnes was born on January 9, 1899, in Jacksonville, Illinois. He attended the local schools and served in the United States Marine Corps during World War I.

Career
Barnes graduated from Illinois College in 1921 and Harvard Law School in 1924. He was admitted to the bar in 1924 and practiced in Jacksonville. He was also active in business, and served on the boards of directors of the Ideal Baking Company, the Jacksonville Farm Supply Company and other companies.

A Democrat, he served as Morgan County Judge from 1926 to 1934, afterwards resuming the practice of law.

Barnes was elected to the Seventy-sixth and Seventy-seventh Congresses and served from January 3, 1939, to January 3, 1943. He was an unsuccessful candidate for reelection in 1942.

In March 1943, Barnes was appointed as administrative assistant to President Roosevelt. He continued in the position under President Truman following Roosevelt's death, serving from March 1, 1943, to July 15, 1945. In 1944 he was a delegate to the Democratic National Convention.

After leaving the White House Barnes practiced law in Washington, D.C.

Death and burial

Barnes died in Washington, D.C., on June 8, 1958. He was buried at Arlington National Cemetery, Section 13, Grave 14684-22-23. His gravesite is near the intersections of Farragut and Wilson Drives.

References

External links

1899 births
1958 deaths
Politicians from Jacksonville, Illinois
United States Marines
United States Marine Corps personnel of World War I
Illinois College alumni
Harvard Law School alumni
Illinois lawyers
Illinois state court judges
Franklin D. Roosevelt administration personnel
Truman administration personnel
Lawyers from Washington, D.C.
American Presbyterians
Burials at Arlington National Cemetery
Democratic Party members of the United States House of Representatives from Illinois